For the American painter, see Manuel Valencia (painter).

Manuel de Jesús Valencia Rodríguez (born August 15, 1977) was a Colombian footballer. 

He played for several clubs in his country and Chile.

Honours

Club
Deportivo Cali
 Primera A (2): 1995–96, 1998

Santiago Wanderers
 Primera División de Chile (1): 2001

External links
 BDFA Profile

1977 births
Living people
Colombian footballers
Atlético Huila footballers
Deportivo Cali footballers
Santiago Wanderers footballers
Deportivo Pasto footballers
C.D. Huachipato footballers
Provincial Osorno footballers
Boyacá Chicó F.C. footballers
Colombian expatriate footballers
Expatriate footballers in Chile
Colombian expatriate sportspeople in Chile
Association football defenders
Sportspeople from Valle del Cauca Department